The Military ranks of Burkina Faso are the military insignia used by the Burkina Faso Armed Forces. Burkina Faso is a landlocked country, and does therefore not possess a navy. Burkina Faso shares a rank structure similar to that of France.

Current ranks

Commissioned officer ranks
The rank insignia of commissioned officers.

Other ranks
The rank insignia of non-commissioned officers and enlisted personnel.

Historic ranks 

During the regime of Thomas Sankara, Burkina Faso briefly introduced Soviet-style rank insignia, which were reverted to the French-style when he was overthrown.

Notes

References

External links 
 

Burkina Faso
Military of Burkina Faso